This is a list of villages in Smolyan Province, Bulgaria.

Alamovtsi
Aligovska
Arda
Banite
Barutin
Belev Dol
Bilyanska
Borikovo
Bostina
Brashten
Bukata
Bukatsite
Chamla
Chavdar
Chepleten
Chereshkite
Chereshovo
Chereshovska Reka
Chokmanovo
Chuchur
Davidkovo
Dimovo
Dolen
Erma Reka
Gyovren
Kasak
Kushla
Lyubcha
Mogilitsa
Momchilovtsi
Shiroka Laka
Smilyan
Startsevo
Tsrancha
Vievo
Zmeitsa

See also
List of villages in Bulgaria

 
Smolyan